The 1920 Penn Quakers football team was an American football team that represented the University of Pennsylvania as an independent during the 1920 college football season. In their first season under head coach John Heisman, the Quakers compiled a 6–4 record, shut out five of nine opponents, and outscored all opponents by a total of 167 to 133. The team played its home games at Franklin Field in Philadelphia.

Schedule

References

Penn
Penn Quakers football seasons
Penn Quakers football